The Women's Combined in the 2018 FIS Alpine Skiing World Cup involved two events.  Wendy Holdener of Switzerland  won the first and then won the season championship and the crystal globe that accompanied it (which was awarded despite only two races being held).

The season was interrupted by the 2018 Winter Olympics from 12-24 February 2018 at Yongpyong Alpine Centre (slalom and giant slalom) at the Alpensia Sports Park in PyeongChang and at the Jeongseon Alpine Centre (speed events) in Jeongseon, South Korea.  The women's combined was held on 22 February.

At this time, combined races were not included in the season finals, which were held in 2018 in Åre, Sweden.

Standings

DNF1 = Did Not Finish run 1
DNF2 = Did Not Finish run 2
DNS = Did Not Start

See also
 2018 Alpine Skiing World Cup – Women's summary rankings
 2018 Alpine Skiing World Cup – Women's Overall
 2018 Alpine Skiing World Cup – Women's Downhill
 2018 Alpine Skiing World Cup – Women's Super-G
 2018 Alpine Skiing World Cup – Women's Giant Slalom
 2018 Alpine Skiing World Cup – Women's Slalom

References

External links
 

Women's Combined
FIS Alpine Ski World Cup women's combined discipline titles